Aaron Gleeman is a writer primarily covering the Minnesota Twins for The Athletic and is the former Editor-in-Chief at Baseball Prospectus. He co-hosts Gleeman and the Geek, a Twins Baseball podcast.  He was the co-founder and main operator of the baseball statistics website, The Hardball Times before leaving to write for NBC Sports.  In 2006, Gleeman was featured in a short profile in Sports Illustrated. He is the author of the book, “The Big 50: Minnesota Twins: The Men and Moments that Made the Minnesota Twins.”

Biography
Gleeman is a graduate of Highland Park High School in St. Paul, MN. After high school, he attended the University of Minnesota as a journalism major. However, the Minnesota Daily did not hire him as a staff writer, despite annual attempts (although they did give him one freelance story which ran on the Daily website) and Gleeman eventually  dropped out of the University without obtaining his degree.

Contributions to sabermetrics

On November 25, 2003, Gleeman used his blog to introduce a new statistic called Gleeman Production Average.  The name was later changed to Gross Production Average to make it more palatable.  The formula is

where OBP is on-base percentage and SLG is slugging percentage.  The result is a number that resembles a batting average but reflects the player's ability to avoid outs and hit for power.

References

External links

The Hardball Times
Introducing GPA
The Big 50: Minnesota Twins: The Men and Moments that Made the Minnesota Twins, 

American male bloggers
American bloggers
Living people
1983 births
University of Minnesota School of Journalism and Mass Communication alumni
American sportswriters
Writers from Saint Paul, Minnesota
21st-century American non-fiction writers
Baseball writers